Ernie Moser (born April 30, 1949) is a Canadian former professional ice hockey right winger who was drafted 9th overall in the 1969 NHL Amateur Draft by the Toronto Maple Leafs.

Career statistics

External links

1949 births
Canadian ice hockey right wingers
Flint Generals (IHL) players
Ice hockey people from Saskatchewan
Living people
Muskegon Mohawks players
National Hockey League first-round draft picks
Springfield Indians players
Toronto Maple Leafs draft picks
Tulsa Oilers (1964–1984) players
People from Rural Municipality Happyland No. 231, Saskatchewan
Canadian expatriate ice hockey players in the United States